Seven Church monastery complex - is one of the oldest Christian monasteries in  Azerbaijan  and in Caucasus, and is a Caucasian Albanian Apostolic monastery located near the village of Ləkit Kötüklü in the Qakh Rayon of the Azerbaijan republic.

References

Church of Caucasian Albania church buildings
Christian monasteries established in the 5th century
5th-century churches